The Battle of Red Banks was an American Civil War battle that took place on December 29, 1864, between Union and Confederate forces. It took place at the Red Banks of the Nolichucky River in Unicoi County, Tennessee near the North Carolina border. Southern soldiers referred to the conflict as the Battle of the Bloody Chucky.

Around 960 Union cavalry of the 3rd North Carolina Mounted Infantry under Colonel George Washington Kirk engaged about 400 Confederate troops of the 64th North Carolina Infantry under Colonel James A. Keith during an extended raid through western North Carolina, southwest Virginia and eastern Tennessee. After eliminating about a quarter of the Confederate troops and forcing the remainder to retreat, the Union Cavalry continued their intended march into Knoxville.

References

Bibliography
Tipton, A. Christine. 2000. Civil War in the Mountains; Greasy Cove, Tennessee. Shining Mountain Publishers.

Citations and Notes

Red Banks
Red Banks
Red Banks
Red Banks
Unicoi County, Tennessee
1864 in Tennessee
December 1864 events
Red Banks